Charles Samuel Peskin (born April 15, 1946) is an American mathematician known for his work in the mathematical modeling of blood flow in the heart.  Such calculations are useful in the design of artificial heart valves.  From this work has emerged an original computational method for fluid-structure interaction that is now called the “immersed boundary method". The immersed boundary method allows the coupling between deformable immersed structures and fluid flows to be handled in a computationally tractable way. With his students and colleagues, Peskin also has worked on mathematical models of such systems as the inner ear, arterial pulse, blood clotting, congenital heart disease, light adaptation in the retina, control of ovulation number, control of plasmid replication, molecular dynamics, and molecular motors.

Peskin received an A.B. (1968) from Harvard University and a Ph.D. (1972) from the Albert Einstein College of Medicine, Yeshiva University and shortly thereafter joined the faculty of the Courant Institute of Mathematical Sciences, New York University.  He has been a productive educator of applied mathematicians, and has advised more than fifty graduate students as of 2014.  Peskin is a MacArthur Fellow and a member of the National Academy of Sciences, the Institute of Medicine and the American Academy of Arts and Sciences.

In 1969 he married Lucille G. Bisesi. Their son Eric is the Manager of High Performance Computing at New York University.

Awards and honors
George David Birkhoff Prize in Applied Mathematics from AMS–SIAM, 2003
Invited Speaker of the International Congress of Mathematicians, 1998
Mayor's Award for Excellence in Science and Technology, 1994
Sidney Fernbach Award, Institute of Electrical and Electronics Engineers Computer Society, 1994
Cray Research Information Technology Leadership Award for Breakthrough Computational Science, 1994
Josiah Willard Gibbs Lecturer, American Mathematical Society, 1993
New York University Margaret and Herman Sokol Faculty Award in the Sciences, 1992
James H. Wilkinson Prize in Numerical Analysis and Scientific Computing, SIAM, 1985
MacArthur Fellowship, 1983–1988

He has also been a fellow of the American Academy of Arts and Sciences since 1994, a member of the National Academy of Sciences since 1995, and a member of the Institute of Medicine since 2000. He is also an inaugural fellow of the American Mathematical Society and the Society for Industrial and Applied Mathematics.

See also
 Cardiac skeleton
 Immersed boundary method

References

External links
Professor Peskin's home page at NYU

Living people
Members of the United States National Academy of Sciences
1946 births
20th-century American mathematicians
21st-century American mathematicians
Fluid dynamicists
Computational fluid dynamicists
MacArthur Fellows
Fellows of the Society for Industrial and Applied Mathematics
Fellows of the American Mathematical Society
Albert Einstein College of Medicine alumni
Courant Institute of Mathematical Sciences faculty
Harvard University alumni
Members of the National Academy of Medicine